Carolina Rodríguez Ballesteros (born 24 May 1986 in León) is a retired Spanish rhythmic gymnast. She is a veteran of the sport who started her senior career in the early 2000s. She competed in three Olympic cycles: at the 2004 Athens where she was member of the Spanish group, at the 2012 London competing as an individual gymnast where she finished 14th in all-around qualifications and at the 2016 Rio competing again as an individual, finishing in 8th in the rhythmic gymnastics individual all-around final.

Career

Early Years 
Rodríguez began rhythmic gymnastics at the age of seven. She says, “Since the first time I saw this sport I fell in love with it.” She competes for the Ritmo club. She has three coaches who are Nina Vitrichenko, Ruth Fernández Menéndez, and Nuria Castaño Fernández. Rodríguez trains for 25 hours per week and she dreams of becoming an Olympic medalist.

In 2001 during the World Championships in Madrid, she became the Junior National Vice-Champion. At the Spanish Rhythmic Gymnastics Championships, she became National Champion three times in individual performances. She was fourth at the 1999 European Championships in the Junior Group. Finally, she was first at the International Tournament of Portimao 1999 also as part of the Junior Group.

In 2009, she won her first World Cup medal, a bronze in ball in Corbeil-Essonnes and won bronze medal in all-around at the 2009 Mediterranean Games in Pescara. At the 2009 European Championships, she won the public vote.

Breakthrough 2013 - present 
In 2013, Rodriguez had her breakthrough season, she won the 2013 Mediterranean Games in Mersin beating Greek gymnast Varvara Filiou (silver) and France's Kseniya Moustafaeva (bronze). In 2014 season, Rodriguez achieved her highest placement in the World Cup series at the 2014 Lisboa World Cup finishing 4th in all-around. She qualified to 3 event finals and won a bronze in clubs. On 30 May – 1 June, Rodriguez competed at the 2014 Minsk World Cup and finished 14th in all-around. On 10–15 June, Rodriguez competed at the 2014 European Championships and finished 10th in all-around. at a press conference, Rodriguez announce her plans to continue competing until the 2016 Olympic Games in Rio de Janeiro, Brazil. On 8–10 August, Rodríguez competed at the 2014 Sofia World Cup finishing 11th in all-around finals. On 22–28 September, Rodriguez placed a career high at the 2014 World Championships finishing 10th in the all-around finals with a total of 68.448 points and qualified to an event final (in ribbon) for the first time at Worlds. In 2015, Rodriguez competed at the 2015 Holon Grand Prix finishing 13th in all-around. Rodriguez finished 15th in all-around at the 2015 Berlin Grand Prix. On 15–21 June, Rodriguez competed at the inaugural 2015 European Games where she finished 13th in the all-around. In July, Rodriguez won the all-around gold at the Izmir International Tournament ahead of Jana Berezko-Marggrander. In August, Rodriguez finished 14th in the all-around at the 2015 Sofia World Cup. On 9–13 September, Rodriguez competed at the 2015 World Championships in Stuttgart and finished 9th in the All-around finals with a total of 70.248 points.

On 12–13 March, Rodriguez competed at the MTM Tournament in Ljubljana, Slovenia finishing 4th in the all-around with a total of 70.750 points, in the apparatus finals; she won a silver in ball. On 17–19 June, Rodriguez competed at the 2016 European Championships where she finished in 9th place with a total of 72.049 points. On 1–3 July, Ashirbayeva competed at the 2016 Berlin World Cup finishing 8th in the all-around with a total of 70.250 points and qualified to all 4 apparatus finals. On 19–20 August, Rodriguez competed at the 2016 Summer Olympics held in Rio de Janeiro, Brazil. She qualified to the rhythmic gymnastics individual all-around final where she finished in 8th place. She announced her retirement from her competitive sports after the Olympic Games.

Routine music information

Notes

References

http://spanishrg.tripod.com/ind-caroro.htm
http://www.clubliceocordoba.es/web/index.php/temporadas-anteriores-noticias/141-carolina-rodriguez-bronce-en-pelota-35-copa-del-mundo-torneo-internacional-de-gimnasia-ritmica-de-corbeil
http://www.smh.com.au/olympics/schedule/gymnastics/day13.html

External links
 
 
 
 
 

1986 births
Living people
Spanish rhythmic gymnasts
Olympic gymnasts of Spain
Gymnasts at the 2004 Summer Olympics
Gymnasts at the 2012 Summer Olympics
Gymnasts at the 2016 Summer Olympics
European Games competitors for Spain
Gymnasts at the 2015 European Games
Mediterranean Games medalists in gymnastics
Mediterranean Games gold medalists for Spain
Mediterranean Games bronze medalists for Spain
Competitors at the 2009 Mediterranean Games
Competitors at the 2013 Mediterranean Games